Strike Back is a British–American action and military television series, broadcasting on Sky One in the United Kingdom, and Cinemax in the United States. It is based on a novel of the same name by novelist and former Special Air Service (SAS) soldier Chris Ryan. Strike Back follows the actions of Section 20, a secretive branch of the British Secret Intelligence Service (MI6), who operate several high risk, priority missions throughout the globe.

The series began broadcasting on Sky One on 5 May 2010, showing the first six-part series. After a second series was commissioned, it was announced that Cinemax would co-produce the franchise. The ten-part second series, undergoing the banner title Project Dawn in the United Kingdom, first aired on Cinemax on 12 August 2011. A ten-part third series, under the banner title Strike Back: Vengeance, has aired in the United Kingdom and United States. The fourth series, Strike Back: Shadow Warfare, has aired both in the United Kingdom, and the United States. The fifth series, Strike Back: Legacy, aired from 3 June to 29 July 2015. A sixth series, Strike Back: Retribution, began airing in the UK on 31 October 2017. A seventh series, Strike Back: Revolution, began airing in the US on 25 January 2019.

As of 05 May 2022, 76 episodes have aired.

Series overview

Episodes

Series 1: Strike Back (2010)

Series 2: Project Dawn (2011)

Series 3: Vengeance (2012)

Series 4: Shadow Warfare (2013)

Series 5: Legacy (2015)

Series 6: Retribution (2017–18)

Series 7: Revolution (2019)

Series 8: The Final Season (2020)

Home video releases

Notes

References

[
Lists of British action television series episodes
E